San Lorenzo Cemetery is a cemetery located in St. Augustine, Florida, United States. One person of note interred there is baseball player Lyle Judy.

References

 http://www.nflcemeteries.org/cemeteries/san-lorenzo/ retrieved April 19, 2016

Cemeteries in Florida
St. Augustine, Florida
Protected areas of St. Johns County, Florida